Samantha Reed Smith (June 29, 1972 – August 25, 1985) was an American peace activist and child actress from Manchester, Maine, who became famous for her anti-war outreaches during the Cold War between the United States and the Soviet Union. In 1982, Smith wrote a letter to the newly appointed General Secretary of the Communist Party of the Soviet Union, Yuri Andropov, and received a personal reply with an invitation to visit the Soviet Union, which she accepted.

Smith attracted extensive media attention in both countries as a "Goodwill Ambassador", becoming known as America's Youngest Ambassador and subsequently participating in peacemaking activities in Japan. With the assistance of her father, Arthur (an academic), she wrote a book titled Journey to the Soviet Union, which chronicled her visit to the country. She later became a child actress, hosting a child-oriented special on the 1984 United States presidential election for The Disney Channel and playing a co-starring role in the television series Lime Street. Smith died at the age of 13 on August 25, 1985, onboard Bar Harbor Airlines Flight 1808, which crashed short of the runway on final approach to the Auburn/Lewiston Municipal Airport in Maine.

Historical context
When Yuri Andropov succeeded Leonid Brezhnev as leader of the Soviet Union in November 1982, the mainstream Western newspapers and magazines ran numerous front-page photographs and articles about him. Most coverage was negative and tended to give a perception of a new threat to the stability of the Western World. Andropov had been the Soviet Ambassador to Hungary during the 1956 Hungarian Revolution, which was put down by the Soviet Army, and the Chairman of the KGB from 1967 to 1982; during his tenure, he was known in the West for crushing the Prague Spring and the brutal suppression of dissidents, such as Andrei Sakharov and Aleksandr Solzhenitsyn. He began his tenure as Soviet leader by strengthening the powers of the KGB, and by suppressing dissidents. According to Vasili Mitrokhin, Andropov saw the struggle for human rights as a part of a wide-ranging imperialist plot to undermine the foundation of the Soviet state. Much international tension surrounded both Soviet and American efforts to develop weapons capable of being launched from satellites in orbit. Both governments had extensive research and development programs to develop such technology. However, both nations were coming under increasing pressure to disband the project. In the United States, President Ronald Reagan came under pressure from a lobby of U.S. scientists and arms experts, while in the Soviet Union the government issued a statement that read, "To prevent the militarization of space is one of the most urgent tasks facing mankind".

At the time, large anti-nuclear protests were taking place across both Europe and North America, in the midst of which the November 20, 1983, screening of ABC's post-nuclear war dramatization The Day After became one of the most anticipated media events of the decade.

The two superpowers had by this point abandoned their strategy of détente and in response to the deployment of cruise and Pershing II missiles  from Reagan in Europe, the Soviet Union deployed its SS-20s. The 1979–1989 Soviet–Afghan War was also into its third year. In this atmosphere, on November 22, 1982, Time magazine published an issue with Andropov on the cover. When Smith viewed the edition, she asked her mother: "If people are so afraid of him, why doesn't someone write a letter asking whether he wants to have a war or not?" Her mother replied, "Why don't you?"

Life
Samantha Smith was born on June 29, 1972, in the small town of Houlton, Maine, on the Canada–United States border, to Jane Goshorn and Arthur Smith. At the age of five, she wrote a letter to Queen Elizabeth II in order to express her admiration to the British monarch. When Smith had finished second grade in spring 1980, the family settled in Manchester, Maine, where she attended Manchester Elementary School. Her father served as an instructor at Ricker College in Houlton before teaching literature and writing at the University of Maine at Augusta while her mother worked as a social worker with the Maine Department of Human Services.

In November 1982, when Smith was 10 years old, she wrote to Soviet leader Yuri Andropov, seeking to understand why Soviet Union–United States relations were so tense:

Her letter was published in the Soviet state-run newspaper Pravda.
Smith was happy to discover that her letter had been published; however, she had not received a reply. She then sent a letter to Soviet ambassador to the United States Anatoly Dobrynin asking if Andropov intended to respond. On April 26, 1983, she received a response from Andropov:

A media circus ensued, with Smith being interviewed by Ted Koppel and Johnny Carson, among others, and with nightly reports by the major American networks. On July 7, 1983, she flew to Moscow with her parents, and spent two weeks as Andropov's guest. During the trip she visited Moscow and Leningrad and spent time in Artek, the main Soviet pioneer camp, in the town of Gurzuf on the Crimean Peninsula. Smith wrote in her book that in Leningrad she and her parents were amazed by the friendliness of the people and by the presents many people made for them. Speaking at a Moscow press conference, she declared that the Russians were "just like us". In Artek, Smith chose to stay with the Soviet children rather than accept the privileged accommodations offered to her. For ease of communication, teachers and children who spoke fluent English were chosen to stay in the building where she was lodged. Smith shared a dormitory with nine other girls, and spent her time there swimming, talking and learning Russian songs and dances. While there, she made many friends, including Natasha Kashirina from Leningrad, a fluent English speaker.

Andropov, however, was unable to meet with her during her visit, although they did speak by telephone. It was later discovered that Andropov had become seriously ill and had withdrawn from the public eye during this time. Smith also received a phone call from Russian cosmonaut Valentina Tereshkova, the first woman to orbit the Earth. However, not realizing with whom she was speaking, Samantha mistakenly hung up after only a brief conversation. Media followed her every step—photographs and articles about her were published by the main Soviet newspapers and magazines throughout her trip and after it. Smith became widely known to Soviet citizens and was well regarded by many of them. In the United States, the event drew suspicion and some regarded it as an "American-style public relations stunt".

Smith's return to the U.S. on July 22, 1983, was celebrated by the people of Maine with roses, a red carpet, and a limousine and her popularity continued to grow in her native country. Some critics at the time remained skeptical, believing Smith was unwittingly serving as an instrument of Soviet propaganda. In December 1983, continuing in her role as "America's Youngest Ambassador", she was invited to Japan, where she met with the Prime Minister Yasuhiro Nakasone and attended the Children's International Symposium in Kobe. In her speech at the symposium, she suggested that Soviet and American leaders exchange granddaughters for two weeks every year, arguing that a president "wouldn't want to send a bomb to a country his granddaughter would be visiting". Her trip inspired other exchanges of child goodwill ambassadors, including a visit by the eleven-year-old Russian child Katya Lycheva to the United States. Later, Smith wrote a book called Journey to the Soviet Union whose cover shows her at Artek, her favorite part of the Soviet trip.

Smith pursued her role as a media celebrity when in 1984, billed as a "Special Correspondent", she hosted a children's special for The Disney Channel entitled Samantha Smith Goes To Washington... Campaign '84. The show covered politics, where Smith interviewed several candidates for the 1984 Democratic Party presidential primaries, including George McGovern, John Glenn and Jesse Jackson. That same year, she guest starred in Charles in Charge as Kim, alongside another celebrity guest star, Julianne McNamara. Her fame resulted in Smith becoming the subject of stalker Robert John Bardo, the man who would later go on to stalk and ultimately murder My Sister Sam actress Rebecca Schaeffer. Bardo traveled to Maine in an attempt to meet Smith, but was stopped by police and returned home.

In 1985, she played the co-starring role of the elder daughter to Robert Wagner's character in the television series Lime Street.

Death
On August 25, 1985, Smith and her father were returning home aboard Bar Harbor Airlines Flight 1808 after filming a segment for Lime Street. While attempting to land at Lewiston-Auburn Regional Airport in Auburn, Maine, the Beechcraft 99 commuter plane struck some trees  short of the runway and crashed, killing all six passengers and two crew on board. Much speculation regarding the cause of the accident circulated afterwards. Accusations of foul play circulated widely in the Soviet Union. An investigation was undertaken in the United States and the official report—which did not show evidence of foul play—was made public. The report said the plane crashed one mile (1.6 km) south-west of the airport at 22:05 EDT, and concluded that "the relatively steep flight path angle and the attitude (the orientation of the aircraft relative to the horizon, direction of motion etc.) and speed of the airplane at ground impact precluded the occupants from surviving the accident." The report said it was a rainy night, that the pilots operating the aircraft were inexperienced, and an accidental, but not uncommon and not usually critical, ground radar failure occurred.

About 1,000 people attended Smith's funeral in Augusta, Maine, and she was eulogized in Moscow as a champion of peace. Attendees included Robert Wagner and Vladimir Kulagin of the Soviet Embassy in Washington, D.C., who read a personal message of condolence from Mikhail Gorbachev.

Everyone in the Soviet Union who has known Samantha Smith will forever remember the image of the American girl who, like millions of Soviet young men and women, dreamt about peace, and about friendship between the peoples of the United States and the Soviet Union. 

President Ronald Reagan sent his condolences to Smith's mother, in writing,

Perhaps you can take some measure of comfort in the knowledge that millions of Americans, indeed millions of people, share the burdens of your grief. They also will cherish and remember Samantha, her smile, her idealism and unaffected sweetness of spirit.

The remains of Samantha and her father were cremated, and their ashes were buried at Estabrook Cemetery, Amity, Maine.

Legacy

Smith's contributions have been honored with a number of tributes by Russians and by the people of her home state of Maine. A monument to her was built in Moscow; "Samantha Smith Alley" in the Artek Young Pioneer camp was named after her in 1986. The monument built to Smith was stolen by metal thieves in 2003 following the dissolution of the Soviet Union in 1991. In 2003, Voronezh retiree Valentin Vaulin built a monument to her after raising funds from private donations. The Soviet Union issued a commemorative stamp with her likeness. In 1986, Russian astronomer Lyudmila Chernykh discovered asteroid 3147, which she named 3147 Samantha. Danish composer Per Nørgård wrote his 1985 viola concerto "Remembering Child" in memory of Smith. A diamond found in Siberia, a mountain in the former Soviet Union, a cultivar of tulips and of dahlias, and an ocean vessel have been named in Smith's honor. In 1985, a peace garden was established in Michigan along the St. Clair River to commemorate her achievements. In Maine, the first Monday in June of each year is officially designated as Samantha Smith Day by state law. There is a bronze statue of Smith near the Maine State Museum in Augusta, which portrays Smith releasing a dove with a bear cub resting at her feet. The bear cub represents both Maine and Russia. Elementary schools in Sammamish, Washington, and in Jamaica, Queens, New York City, have been named after Samantha. In October 1985, Smith's mother founded The Samantha Smith Foundation, which fostered student exchanges between the United States and the Soviet Union (and, after December 1991, the ex-Soviet successor states) until it became dormant in the mid-1990s. The Foundation was formally dissolved in 2014 after two decades of dormancy.

A 1987 episode of the U.S. sitcom The Golden Girls entitled "Letter to Gorbachev" draws inspiration from Smith's story. In addition, the 1987 film Superman IV: The Quest for Peace included a scene where a boy writes Superman a letter to control the nuclear arms race; according to Christopher Reeve, this scene was also inspired by Smith's story.

In the mid-1980s, after Smith's death, a script was written for a television movie titled The Samantha Smith Story with Robert Wagner as producer. Columbia Pictures Television and R. J. Wagner Productions were reported to have agreed to produce the film for NBC, with Soviet company Sovin Film interested in co-producing it. Ultimately, Columbia Pictures Television decided not to film it due to lack of interest from any network.

Speculation as to what a surviving Samantha might have done in adulthood was dismissed by her mother Jane as unanswerable in 2003, given Samantha was only thirteen when she died and her ambitions had varied from a veterinarian to a ballerina. The notion, which had been put to Samantha herself in the eighties, that she could be President of the United States in adulthood, was dismissed by her in the Disney Channel special that she hosted, with the words "being President is not a job I would like to have".
  
In 2008, Smith posthumously received the Peace Abbey Courage of Conscience Award for "helping to bring about better understanding between the peoples of the [USA and the USSR], and as a result, reduce the tension between the superpowers that were poised to engage in nuclear war". The Peace Abbey has also proposed The Peace Literature Project in Honor of Samantha Smith "to educate students about peace and promote peace literature for school-age children in 50 selected pilot schools across the United States".

Elliott Holt's 2013 novel You Are One of Them, uses the story of Smith as inspiration for a fictional character, Jennifer Jones.

On the 30th anniversary of the plane crash in 2015, the Maine State Museum opened a new exhibit of materials related to Smith, including photographs of her time at the Artek camp, traditional Russian clothing she was given, and an issue of Soviet Life magazine with her on the cover.

See also
 List of peace activists
 Sarah York, another American girl who wrote to a foreign political leader, in this case Manuel Noriega

References

Further reading
 
 Nelson, Lena (2023). America's Youngest Ambassador: The Cold War Story of Samantha Smith's Lasting Message of Peace. Down East Books. https://www.amazon.com/Americas-Youngest-Ambassador-Samantha-Lasting/dp/1684750202/ref=sr_1_1?keywords=america%27s+youngest+ambassador&qid=1660253785&sprefix=america%27s+youngest%2Caps%2C138&sr=8-1
 Neumann, Matthias (April 2019). "Children Diplomacy During the Late Cold War: Samantha Smith's Visit of the 'Evil Empire. History. 104 (360); pp. 275–308. .
 Peacock, Margaret (2018). "Samantha Smith in the Land of the Bolsheviks: Peace and the Politics of Childhood in the Late Cold War". Diplomatic History 43 (3); pp. 418–444. .

External links

 SamanthaSmith.info – Official site
 
 "A Nightline Moment from 1983" – ABC News, December 2004
 Samantha Smith, This Day in History: August 25
 Contemporary news article pertaining to the death of Samantha Smith from UPI
 "This plucky Maine girl tried to unite US and Russia before nuclear bombs consumed the world"—Article from the Bangor Daily News
 "Samantha Smith's peace-seeking letter to Soviet Union endures as lesson for children to ask questions about world events"—article from the Kennebec Journal
 

1972 births
1985 deaths
20th-century American actresses
Accidental deaths in Maine
Actresses from Maine
American anti-war activists
American child activists
American child actresses
American child writers
American television actresses
People from Manchester, Maine
People of the Cold War
Soviet Union–United States relations
Victims of aviation accidents or incidents in 1985
Victims of aviation accidents or incidents in the United States
Child deaths